Old 8×10 is the third studio album by American country music artist Randy Travis. It was released on July 12, 1988 by Warner Bros. Records Nashville. The album produced the singles "Honky Tonk Moon", "Deeper Than the Holler", "Is It Still Over", and "Promises". All of these except "Promises" reached Number One on the Hot Country Songs charts in the late 1980s. The British and German editions of the album (the first Randy Travis release in the latter) contained the bonus track "Forever and Ever, Amen". In January 1990, Old 8×10 earned Travis three American Music Awards for 'Favorite Country Male Artist', 'Favorite Country Album', and 'Favorite Country Single' (Deeper Than the Holler).

Track listing

Personnel
Baillie & The Boys - background vocals
Eddie Bayers - drums
Michael Brooks - background vocals
Dennis Burnside - piano
Larry Byrom - acoustic guitar
Mark Casstevens - acoustic guitar
Jerry Douglas - Dobro
Béla Fleck - banjo
Paul Franklin - Pedabro
Steve Gibson - acoustic guitar, electric guitar
Doyle Grisham - steel guitar
David Hungate - bass guitar
Teddy Irwin - acoustic guitar
Shane Keister - piano
Kyle Lehning - piano
Dennis Locorriere - background vocals
Larrie Londin - drums
Brent Mason - acoustic guitar, electric guitar
Terry McMillan - harmonica, percussion
Mark O'Connor - fiddle
Billy Puett - clarinet, bass clarinet
Dennis Sollee - clarinet
Randy Travis - lead vocals, acoustic guitar
Jack Williams - bass guitar

Charts

Weekly charts

Year-end charts

Certifications

References

1988 albums
Randy Travis albums
Warner Records albums
Albums produced by Kyle Lehning
Canadian Country Music Association Top Selling Album albums